Elena Oznobkina (Russian: Елена Вячеславовна Ознобкина; April 25, 1959 – March 10, 2010) was a philosopher, theorist, historian of philosophy, lecturer, translator, editor, journalist, researcher of penitentiary systems, and Russian human rights activist. She is best known as a researcher of modern Western philosophy, a translator and editor of translations of Nietzsche and Husserl into Russian, a critic of the Russian penitentiary system, and the editor of the Russian edition of Index on Censorship magazine.

Life and career
Born in Moscow USSR, Oznobkina grew up in a family, whose parents were a government official and an agricultural scientist. She received a typical cultured middle-class upbringing. Oznobkina attended Moscow State University from 1977 to 1982, majoring in the history of Western philosophy. She defended her Specialist Diploma thesis, entitled "The Unity of three Kant's Critiques", in 1982. After graduation, Oznobkina worked as a lecturer/assistant professor at the Moscow Institute of Agricultural Engineers, and did research as a part-time graduate student at the Institute of Philosophy of the Academy of Sciences of USSR.

She defended her Candidate of Science Dissertation (equivalent of PhD. thesis), entitled "Heidegger's Critique of Kant", in 1987, and become a researcher at the Institute of Philosophy of the Academy of Sciences of USSR in 1988.

She worked at the Institute of Philosophy since 1988, first, as a researcher, at the section of Postclassic Western Philosophy, and afterwards, as a senior researcher, at the section of the section of Analytical Anthropology until her death, which followed after a long period of incurable disease, which limited her to her apartment in the last years of her life.

As it often happens in Russian philosophy, her thought found its expression not in monographs, but mostly in articles, university courses, interviews, and reviews. Although these are "small forms", they were no less influential, than many books. As well, her editorship legacy is very influential in ideological culture of modern Russia.

Academic activity
In 1982 Oznobkina started her academic career as Lecturer/Assistant Professor at the Moscow institute of Agricultural Engineers, where she delivered various courses on history of philosophy until 1987, when she became a full-time researcher.
In 1993–2002, she was an invited lecturer at the Russian State University for the Humanities and at State Academic University for the Humanities. She developed and taught such courses as: "Introduction into Philosophical Anthropology", "Corporeality in Philosophy of Modernity", "Kant's Anthropology: Modern Revision", "Classic and Modern Philosophy of Punishment", and others.

Kant's Anthropology 

In a series of lectures for Russian State University for the Humanities, Oznobkina built an interpretation of Kant, which is in many ways opposite to the classic for modern Russia, Merab Mamardashvili's interpretation. She insists that Kant's philosophical experience is very "aggressive", and entails removal of many phenomena from the space of classic European philosophy, due to natural  language limitation. Oznobkina states that comparison of Kant's logic and classic logic allows to discover borders of Kant's "cultural utopia", and causes of incongruency of his philosophical language.

Editorship, translation and publishing activities
In last 15 years, Oznobkina concentrated her research interests on the analytical critique of penitentiary system. She combined it with research on variegated aspects of the Russian and Soviet prison system, and the promotion of human rights of prisoners. She was one of editors of the Russian edition of the Index on Censorship magazine (from 1997 ).

She was also a prominent translator and editor of the modern Russian translations of works of Nietzsche and Husserl, as well as other Western philosophers.

She edited many important Russian books on philosophy and human rights.

She actively published in leading Russian literary magazines.

Human rights activism
Starting in 1992 Oznobkina became active in human rights movement. She participated in activities of the "Glastnost Defence Foundation", and the Committee for Public Investigation on Chechnya (since 1994),.

Other activities
Oznobkina was an avid philatelist, and published several articles in Russian philatelist magazines.

References

External links
 Obituary (Index journal)
 Institute of Philosophy page
 Glastnost Defence Foundation page (in Russian)
 Publications list (in Russian)
 State Academic University for the Humanities (in Russian)
 Index' site (summary in English)
 Igor Ebanoidze's essay in memoriam of Elena (2014) (in Russian)

Selected bibliography

Articles
 Death punishment (in Russian), "Personal Development"

Interviews and talks
 Interview with V. Podoroga

Reviews
 Review of "Thoughts of Death Punishment" 
 Review of "Prison cubculture in Russia" 
 Revier of "Abolition of Death Punishment"

Books edited
 Filosofskie Marginalii  by Institut filosofii (Akademiia nauk SSSR), E. V. Oznobkina  Hardcover, Akademiia nauk SSSR, In-t filosofii.
 KGB—Vchera, Segodnia, Zavtra: Mezhdunarodnye Konferentsii I Kruglye Stoly Zakonodatelstvo, Obshchestvennyi Kontrol, Spetssluzhby I Prava Cheloveka, by E. V. Oznobkina, TSentr po informatsii i analizu deiatelnosti rossiiskikh spetssluzhb (Moscow, Russia)  Hardcover, Izd-vo Znak-SP.
 KGB—Vchera, Segodnia, Zavtra: Sbornik Dokladov  by E. V. Oznobkina, Liliia Isakova  Hardcover, Gendalf.
 Voina V Chechne: Mezhdunarodnyi Tribunal Rabochaia Vstrecha, Stokgolm, 15-16 Dekabria, 1995 by E. V. Oznobkina, Liliia Isakova, Obshchestvennyi fond Glasnost (Moscow, Russia)  Hardcover, Obshchestvennyi fond Glasnost.

1959 births
2010 deaths
Soviet dissidents
Soviet human rights activists
Women human rights activists
Russian philatelists
Women philatelists
Russian women philosophers
Historians of philosophy
20th-century Russian philosophers
Continental philosophers
20th-century Russian translators
20th-century women writers
20th-century Russian women